In mathematics, the Askey–Wilson polynomials (or q-Wilson polynomials) are a family of orthogonal polynomials introduced by  as q-analogs of the Wilson polynomials. They include many of the other orthogonal polynomials in 1 variable as special or limiting cases, described in the Askey scheme.

They are defined by 

Proof 

This result can be proven since it is known that

and using the definition of the q-Pochhammer symbol

which leads to the conclusion that it equals

See also
Askey scheme

References

Q-analogs
Hypergeometric functions
Orthogonal polynomials